Travis West (January 13, 1967 – June 14, 2004) was an American wrestler. He competed in the men's Greco-Roman 74 kg at the 1992 Summer Olympics.

References

External links
 

1967 births
2004 deaths
American male sport wrestlers
Olympic wrestlers of the United States
Wrestlers at the 1992 Summer Olympics
Sportspeople from Phoenix, Arizona